Boulenophrys baolongensis is a species of frog in the family Megophryidae located in China. Its type locality is Baolong in Wushan County, Chongqing, China.

References

baolongensis
Amphibians described in 2007